Nevena Mineva (born 14 June 1972) is a Bulgarian racewalker. She competed in the women's 20 kilometres walk at the 2004 Summer Olympics.

References

1972 births
Living people
Athletes (track and field) at the 2004 Summer Olympics
Bulgarian female racewalkers
Olympic athletes of Bulgaria
Place of birth missing (living people)